Douglas Craig Bennett (October 31, 1951 – October 16, 2004) was the lead singer of Canadian rock band Doug and the Slugs. He also produced and directed music videos for artists such as Headpins, Trooper, Zappacosta, Suzanne Gitzi, and Images in Vogue as well as for the Slugs themselves.

Born in Toronto, Bennett moved to Vancouver in 1973. In 1977, he formed Doug and the Slugs and the band toured extensively through North America in the 1980s.  Bennett wrote or co-wrote such songs as "Too Bad," "Day By Day," "Making It Work", and "Tomcat Prowl."

Besides works with Doug and the Slugs, Bennett released a solo album, Animato, in 1986.

Bennett died in Calgary on October 16, 2004, after a lengthy illness, a week after falling into a coma.

He was the subject of the documentary Doug and the Slugs and Me by director Teresa Alfeld, which had its world premiere at the 2022 DOXA Documentary Film Festival.

References

External links
  (memorial service program)
 Pique News article Doug and the Slugs Front Man Dead at 52
 DougAndTheSlugs.ca Official Doug And The Slugs website
 CanadianBands.com entry for Doug And The Slugs
 Doug and the Slugs at The Canadian Encyclopedia
 
 Doug Bennett at Jam!/The Canadian Pop Encyclopedia 

1951 births
2004 deaths
Canadian rock singers
20th-century Canadian male singers
Canadian music video directors
Musicians from Toronto